Jennifer Schwalbach Smith, sometimes credited as Jennifer Schwalbach, is an American actress, podcaster and former reporter for USA Today.

Career
While a USA Today reporter, Schwalbach met film director Kevin Smith while interviewing him for an assignment. She got a job briefly at MTV and resigned after becoming pregnant with their daughter.

According to his commentary for the DVD release of the 2001 film Jay and Silent Bob Strike Back, Smith was looking for someone to play Missy, one of the female diamond robbers. Schwalbach asked to play the role and he decided to give her a chance. Their daughter, Harley, also appeared at the beginning of the film as baby Silent Bob.

Schwalbach went on to have supporting roles in other Smith-related productions such as Jersey Girl (in which Harley also appeared), and an episode of the Canadian TV series Degrassi: The Next Generation in which Smith appeared in the episode "Goin' Down the Road: Part 1". She also played a prostitute in the 2002 film Now You Know.

In January 2004, Schwalbach Smith appeared nude, with a Superman look-alike, for Playboy Magazine's 50th Anniversary Issue, in a photograph taken by her husband.

Her directorial credit is as co-director with Malcolm Ingram for Oh, What a Lovely Tea Party, an extensive 3+ hour documentary on the making of Jay and Silent Bob Strike Back. The film was shown at Vulgarthon 2005 in Los Angeles, a private film festival hosted by Kevin Smith, and was shown again at Vulgarthon 2006 in Red Bank, New Jersey.

In 2006's Clerks II, she played Dante Hicks' fiancée, Emma Bunting; and a minor role of Betsy in Smith's 2008 film Zack and Miri Make a Porno. Schwalbach appeared as Esther Cooper in Kevin Smith's horror film, Red State and voiced Blunt-Girl in Jay & Silent Bob's Super Groovy Cartoon Movie.

Schwalbach was a co-host for the daily internet radio show called SMod Co SMorning Show on SModcast Internet Radio (S.I.R) hosted on SModcast.com. She previously co-hosted a show called Plus One Per Diem which was cancelled in favor of SMod Co SMorning Show.

In 2010, she and her husband began co-hosting a podcast called Plus One. As of June 2013, there were 37 episodes.

Personal life
Born in Newark, New Jersey, Schwalbach married Kevin Smith at Skywalker Ranch on April 25, 1999, becoming involved with him after interviewing him for USA Today regarding rumors that he was the true author of Good Will Hunting. She helped Smith deal with the stress he experienced from the drug addiction of his friend Jason Mewes, who was living with them. For several years, she would witness Mewes' repeated sobriety and relapses, and at one point, she banned him from their house, but Mewes eventually got sober.

Her daughter with Smith, Harley Quinn Smith, was born June 26, 1999, and was named after the character Harley Quinn from Batman. They live in the Hollywood Hills area of Los Angeles. Schwalbach has been vegetarian for most of her life.

Filmography

References

External links

 
 
 
 

21st-century American actresses
Actresses from Florida
Actresses from Newark, New Jersey
American film actresses
American film producers
American women podcasters
American podcasters
American reporters and correspondents
American television actresses
American women journalists
Living people
University of California, Los Angeles alumni
USA Today journalists
American women film producers
Kevin Smith
Year of birth missing (living people)